A list of the films produced in the Cinema of Mexico ordered by year of release in the 1950s. For an alphabetical list of articles on Mexican films see :Category:Mexican films.

1950
 List of Mexican films of 1950

1951
 List of Mexican films of 1951

1952
 List of Mexican films of 1952

1953
 List of Mexican films of 1953

1954
 List of Mexican films of 1954

1955
 List of Mexican films of 1955

1956
 List of Mexican films of 1956

1957
 List of Mexican films of 1957

1958
 List of Mexican films of 1958

1959
 List of Mexican films of 1959

External links
 Mexican film at the Internet Movie Database

Mexican
Films

fr:Liste de films mexicains
zh:墨西哥電影列表